Metabotropic glutamate receptor 7 is a protein that in humans is encoded by the GRM7 gene.

Function 

L-glutamate is the major excitatory neurotransmitter in the central nervous system and activates both ionotropic and metabotropic glutamate receptors.  Glutamatergic neurotransmission is involved in most aspects of normal brain function and can be perturbed in many neuropathologic conditions. The metabotropic glutamate receptors are a family of G protein-coupled receptors, that have been divided into 3 groups on the basis of sequence homology, putative signal transduction mechanisms, and pharmacologic properties.  Group I includes GRM1 and GRM5 and these receptors have been shown to activate phospholipase C.  Group II includes GRM2 and GRM3 while Group III includes GRM4, GRM6, GRM7 and GRM8.  Group II and III receptors are linked to the inhibition of the cyclic AMP cascade but differ in their agonist selectivities.  Alternative splice variants of GRM8 have been described but their full-length nature has not been determined. 

Glutamate has lower affinity for mGluR7 than the other metabotropic glutamate receptors and it has been suggested that mGluR7 may have a regulatory role to dampen the effects of excessive glutamate levels.

Ligands

Agonists 

AMN082: allosteric agonist; induces rapid internalization; non-glutamatergic binding component

 LSP2-9166: mixed agonist at mGluR4 and mGluR7

Antagonists 

 MMPIP: allosteric antagonist/inverse agonist
 XAP044

Negative allosteric modulators
 ADX71743

Interactions 

Metabotropic glutamate receptor 7 has been shown to interact with PICK1.

Clinical

Mutations in both copies have been associated with developmental and epileptic encephalopathy, microcephaly, hypomyelination and cerebral atrophy.

References

Further reading 

 
 
 
 
 
 
 
 
 
 
 
 
 

Metabotropic glutamate receptors